Moose is a surname. Notable people with the surname include:

Bob Moose (1947–1976), American Major League Baseball pitcher
Charles Moose (1953–2021), Chief of Police in Montgomery County, Maryland, at the time of the Beltway sniper attacks in October 2002
George Moose (born 1944), American diplomat
James S. Moose, Jr. (1903–1989), American diplomat
Justin Moose (born 1983), American soccer player
Richard M. Moose (born 1932), American government official
Rob Moose (born 1982), American musician